Brayden Iose (born 26 August 1998 in New Zealand) is a New Zealand rugby union player who plays for the  in Super Rugby. His playing position is flanker or number 8. He was named in the Hurricanes squad for the 2021 Super Rugby Aotearoa season. He was also a member of the  2020 Mitre 10 Cup squad.

Reference list

External links
itsrugby.co.uk profile

1998 births
New Zealand rugby union players
Living people
Rugby union flankers
Rugby union number eights
Manawatu rugby union players
Hurricanes (rugby union) players
Rugby union players from the Wellington Region
People from Paraparaumu